Stratford Independent School District is a public school district based in Stratford, Texas (USA).  Located in Sherman County, the district extends into a small portion of Dallam County.

In 2009, the school district was rated "recognized" by the Texas Education Agency.

Schools
Stratford High School
Stratford Junior High School
Stratford Elementary School

References

External links
 Stratford ISD

School districts in Sherman County, Texas
School districts in Dallam County, Texas